The al-Assad family, also known as the Assad dynasty, has ruled Syria since General Hafez al-Assad became President of Syria in 1971 under the Ba'ath Party. After his death, in June 2000, he was succeeded by his son Bashar al-Assad.

The Assads are originally from Qardaha, near Latakia, in north-west Syria. They are members of the minority Alawite sect and belong to the Kalbiyya tribe. The family name Assad goes back to 1927, when Ali Sulayman (1875–1963) changed his last name to al-Assad, Arabic for "the lion", possibly in connection with his social standing as a local mediator and his political activities. All members of the extended Assad family stem from Ali Sulayman and his second wife Naissa, who came from a village in the Syrian Coastal Mountains.

During his early reign in the 1970s, Hafez al-Assad created patronage networks of Ba'ath party elites and Alawite figures loyal to his family. Members of Assad family established control over vast swathes of the Syrian economy and corruption became endemic in the public and private sectors. After Hafez al-Assad's death, family connections continued to be important in Syrian politics. Several close family members of Hafez al-Assad also held vital positions in the government since his rise to power, an arrangement which exists to the present day. Syrian bureaucracy and business-community are also dominated by members of the Assad dynasty and individuals affiliated with them.

Hafez Al-Assad built his regime as a bureaucracy that was marked by a distinct cult of personality, uncharacteristic in modern Syrian history. Images, portraits, quotes and praises of Assad are displayed everywhere from schools to public markets and government offices; and Hafez al-Assad is referred as the "Immortal Leader" and the "al-Muqaddas (Sanctified One)" in official Assadist ideology. Hafez re-organised the Syrian society in militaristic lines and persistently invoked conspiratorial rhetoric on the dangers of foreign-backed plots abetted by fifth columnists and promoted the armed forces as a central aspect of public life. Following the death of Hafez; the personality cult was inherited by his son and successor Bashar al-Assad who is hailed by the party as the "Young Leader" and "Hope of the People". Highly influenced by the model of the North Korean Kim dynasty, official propaganda ascribes divine features to the Assad dynasty; and reveres the Assad patriarchs as the founding fathers of modern Syria.

Origin 
The Assad family originates from Ali Sulayman al-Wahsh, Hafez al-Assad's father, who was born in 1875 and lived in the village of Qardaha in the coastal Syrian mountains. The locals reportedly nicknamed him "Wahsh", Arabic for "wild beast", because he was physically strong and a good fighter. Al-Wahsh remained the family name until the 1920s, when it was changed to al-Assad, Arabic for "lion". Because of Sulayman's reported strength and marksmanship, he was respected in his village. At the outbreak of World War I, the Ottoman governor of the Aleppo Vilayet sent troops to the area to collect taxes and round up recruits. The troops were reportedly fought off by Sulayman and his friends who were only armed with sabres and old muskets. Because Sulayman was respected, he was a local mediator between quarreling families. He was also one of the local chieftains who were the de facto rulers of the area. The chieftains from the powerful families would provide protection to their neighbours and in return they gained loyalty and respect. He lived until 1963, long enough to see his son's rise to power. He married twice and over three decades had eleven children. His first wife Sa'ada was from the district of Haffeh. They had three sons and two daughters. His second wife was Na'isa, twenty years younger than him. She was the daughter of Uthman Abbud from the village of Al-Qutailibiyah, a dozen kilometres further up the mountain. They had a daughter and five sons. Hafez was born on 6 October 1930 and was the fourth child.

The family religion of al-Assad is Shia Islam, more specifically the Alawite sect. Since coming to power in 1970, Assad family traditionally used sectarian loyalty from the Alawite sect as a vital component to legitimize their dynastic rule. Many Alawite loyalists have been assigned to crucial posts in the bureaucracy, security forces, military, judiciary, etc. in-order to consolidate Assad family's grip on power.

Cult of Personality 

During the 1950s, Syrian Alawites started becoming influential in the Syrian Armed Forces and Ba'ath party. Led by Alawite military officers like Salah Jadid and Hafez al-Assad, Ba'athist factions staged a series of coups during the 1960s and built up a one-party state. The party cemented its total control over the state and society by purging civilian elites, pursued an aggressive propaganda policy of "state-nationalist indoctrination" and established patronage networks based on sectarian lines to mobilise support. Following the 1970 coup d'etat that ousted his rival Salah Jadid; Hafez al-Assad developed a Stalinist-style personality cult around him; which depicted him as the father figure of Syrian nation. After Hafez's death, the personality cult was extended towards his son, Bashar al-Assad. Monuments, pictures, statues, symbols and billboards of both the leaders extensively pervade the Syrian society; designed to consolidate the notion of "Assad's Syria". Observers view the state propaganda efforts as a strategy for securing the compliance of the masses and identifying the Syrian nationhood with the Assad dynasty. 

On the other hand, exaggerations of the propaganda and ever-deepening importance attached to upholding the personality cult around the Assad patriarchs have resulted in the simultaneous de-emphasis on the Syrian identity itself; due to the duplication of reality. In addition to criminalising any and all critiques of the regime; the modes of conveying messages between the state and civil society are restricted strictly within bounds of what is officially acceptable. The state further banned private political opinions critical of the regime and encourages citizens to report relatives and friends who exhibit undesirable attitudes. The policies of economic liberalization implemented during the 2000s worsened the corruption; since the chief grantees of the outcomes were businessmen and relatives close to the Assad family; such as Rami Makhlouf.

Unlike other Arab dictatorships, this feature of the Baath regime and total centralisation of power in the hands of the Assad patriarchs had enabled it to instill apoliticism amongst its citizens; where the ritualisation of state slogans and symbolism had led to de facto compliance. As a result, there are far fewer avenues of free political activism for ordinary Syrians as compared to other Arab states. Until recently, political activism was shunned by many people; instead preferring the stability offered by the regime. The rise of internet and satellite channels and proliferation of civil society groups, independent political activists, etc. during the 2000s increasingly began to challenge state monopoly on information; which have lead to rising political dissidence amongst the younger generations. Describing the hardships to raise the political consciousness of Syrian citizens by contrasting their situation with other Arab protestors, Caroline, a Syrian Christian and civic activist imprisoned by regime during the 2011-12 Arab Spring protests, states:"Before the revolution in Egypt, people were allowed to gather, had political parties; people were exposed to political life. In Syria, we were away from politics. We were raised in Syria and our parents used to tell us that we shouldn't talk with anyone about our religion or about politics”Since Hafez al-Assad's seizure of power in 1970; state propoganda has promoted a new national discourse based on unifying Syrians under "a single imagined Ba’athist identity" and Assadism. Fervently loyalist paramilitaries known as the Shabiha (tr. ghosts) diefy the Assad dynasty through slogans such as "There is no God but Bashar!" and pursue psychological warfare against non-conformist populations.

Hafez's family

Hafez al-Assad 
Hafez al-Assad (1930–2000). President of Syria 1971–2000.
Anisa Makhlouf (1930–2016), wife of Hafez and First Lady of Syria.
 Bushra al-Assad, died as an infant before 1960.
Bushra al-Assad (born 1960) is a pharmacist and married with five children to: Gen. Assef Shawkat (1950–2012), was deputy-chief of staff of the Syrian army and the former head of military intelligence. He was killed on 18 July 2012 in a bombing in Damascus, during the Syrian Civil War.
 Bassel al-Assad (1962–1994), was the original candidate for presidential succession, however, he died in a car accident.
 Bashar al-Assad (born 1965), is the President of Syria since 2000. Before Bassel's death he was an ophthalmologist. He is married to Asma al-Assad (born 1975). She is the current First Lady of Syria and takes a prominent public role. Before being married she was an investment banker. They have three children. The couple are also regarded as the "main economic players" in Syria and control large parts of Syrian business sectors, banking, telecommunications, real estate, and maritime industries.
 Majid al-Assad (1966–2009), was an electrical engineer with a reported history of severe mental problems. Died after a long, unspecified illness. He was married to Ru’a Ayyoub (born 1976) and had no children. Majid died in Damascus on December 12, 2009.
 Maher al-Assad (born 1967), is the commander of the Republican Guard, which are also known as the Presidential Guard, and the army's elite Fourth Armored Division, which together with Syria's secret police form the core of the country's security forces. He is also a member of the Ba'ath Party central command and is said to have an aggressive and uncontrollable personality. He is married and has two daughters. He is reported to have been severely disabled in a 2012 bombing in Damascus during the Syrian Civil War. He reportedly shot Assef Shawkat in the stomach in October 1999, during an argument. Maher is also known by many to be the most ruthless in the Al-Assad family.

Hafez's siblings

Jamil al-Assad

Jamil al-Assad (1932–2004), parliamentarian and commander of a minor militia. Politically marginalized years before his death.  Children:
 Mundhir al-Assad (born 1961), was arrested in 2005 at the Beirut Airport while entering Lebanon. He was reported to have been involved in arms smuggling to the Iraqi insurgents. In 2011, the EU placed sanctions on him for being involved with the Shabbiha militia in the repression of protestors during the Syrian Civil War.
 Fawwaz al-Assad (1962–2015), was the first real Shabiha and gave the meaning known today to the word Shabiha and the concept of Tashbeeh that is to act like a thug. He had sanctions placed on him in 2011 by the EU for being involved with the Shabbiha militia in the repression of protestors during the Syrian Civil War.
 One daughter is married to Yarob Kanaan, whose father is: Ghazi Kanaan (1942–2005) who in 2005 during his term as interior minister presumably killed himself. The Kanaans come from the Kalabiyya tribe.

Rifaat al-Assad

Rifaat al-Assad (born 1937). Formerly a powerful security chief and commander of the Defense Companies, who was responsible for the 1982 Hama massacre. After attempting a coup d'état in 1987, he went into exile in France and now lives in London. He is married with four wives:  Amira 'Aziz al-Assad (died 2019), a cousin  Sana' Ismail Makhluf (died 2021), from the family of Hafez's wife  Rajaa Bakrat, from a wealthy Sunni Damascene family  Lina al-Khayer, sister of Hessa bint Tarad al-Shaalan, wife of the late Saudi king Abdullah bin Abdulaziz  Rifaat has a number of children from these marriages, including:
 Ribal al-Assad, has lived abroad since he was nine years old, currently he lives in the United States. In an interview in 2010, he denied that his father was involved in the massacre of Hama or that his family's branch was connected to Abdul Halim Khaddam or Ghazi Kanaan.
 Somar al-Assad, supports his father actively in his opposition to Bashar.
 Lamia, is married to 'Ala al-Fayad, the son of Shafiq Fayadh (former Syrian General).
 Mudar al-Assad, is married to May Haydar, daughter of the Syrian multimillionaire Muhammad Haydar.
 Tumadhir, is married to Mu'ein Nasif Kheirbek also from the Kalabiyya tribe and related to Mohammed Nasif Kheirbek, who is indirectly related by marriage and blood to Abd al-Halim Khaddam, Rafik Hariri and the influential Homs al-Atassi family.
 Firas al-Assad, accused his cousin, president Bashar, of killing more than 100,000 Alawites and more than half a million Syrians in order to stay in power.

Shalish family
Sister of Hafez al-Assad married into the Shalish family. The family through paternal cousin General Dhu al Himma al-Shalish maintains a significant level of influence in the Bashar al-Assad government. The Shalishes are mainly active in the automobile and construction sectors. American government sources also report that the Shalish family has engaged in a wide range of illicit activities including smuggling and money laundering.
 Gen. Dhu al-Himma Shalish (1956–2022), a cousin of Bashar al-Assad, was the head of presidential security and was part of the inner circle of leadership of the Bashar al-Assad government. He had sanctions placed on him by the US government for supplying weapons to Saddam Hussein and his government. On 24 June 2011, the EU sanctioned him for being involved in violence against demonstrators during the Syrian Civil War.
 Asef Isa Shalish, nephew of Dhu al-Himma, is the manager of SES, a company that was involved in the weapons trade with Iraq and Iran.
Riyad Shalish, a cousin of Bashar Assad and the former director of the governmental construction organization the Military Housing Establishment, which during the 1990s he managed to transform into his own company. He made a fortune on construction and contracting deals in Syria involving large scale projects financed by other Arab states. On 24 June 2011, the EU sanctioned him for providing funding to the regime to repress protesters of the Syrian Civil War.

Ahmed al-Assad
Ahmed al-Assad (1910-1975), was an older half-brother of Hafez from Ali's first wife Sa'ada.
Anwar al-Assad,
Hilal al-Assad, was the president of the Syrian Arabian Horse Association. Hilal was killed on 22 March 2014, in the battle for a border crossing with Turkey in the north of Latakia.
 Suleiman al-Assad, Hilal's son, was arrested in August 2015 after allegedly murdering an off-duty colonel in a 'road rage' incident in Latakia. He was sentenced to 20 years in prison but in late 2020 was released after four years.
Hael al-Assad, is the head of the Military Police of the army's 4th Armoured Division, whose official commander is General Ali Ammar, but whose de facto commander is Maher al-Assad. He is also the director of the prison in which Maher al-Assad keeps his personal prisoners outside of state jurisdiction.
Haroun al-Assad, is an elected municipal official of the village of Qardaha.
Daad al-Assad, is married to General Zouheir al-Assad, who was born in 1958 and is a distant cousin. General Zouheir al-Assad commanded the 90th Regiment, a unit of some 10,000 men, charged with protecting the capital.
Karam Al Assad, leads a group of Shabiha. He and his group of shabiha led an assault against the peaceful protests during the "night of destiny". The assault ended in two deaths and dozens injured.

Isma'il al-Assad 
Isma'il al-Assad (1913-?) was an older half-brother of Hafez from Ali's first wife Sa'ada.
Tawfiq al-Assad,
Muhammad al-Assad, another leader of the "Struggle companies". He was killed in a dispute with a powerful person over control in the al-Qerdaha area of Latakia province, on 14 March 2015.
Hussein al-Assad, son of Muhammad. He took over the criminal network of his father and reorganized it into a paramilitary unit, the Lions of Hussein.

Ibrahim al-Assad
Ibrahim al-Assad, was an older half-brother of Hafez al-Assad from Ali Sulayman's first wife Sa'ada. He was married to Umm Anwar who took over the smuggling business of her son Malek.
Malek al-Assad was the first known smuggler in the Assad family.

About Hafez's siblings who died early: Bayat, Bahijat and an unknown sister almost nothing is known.

Anisa's siblings

Makhlouf family
The Makhloufs belong to the Alawi Haddad tribe, both Hafez and Rifaat are related through marriage to the Makhloufs. The Makhlouf family rose from humble beginnings to become the financial advisor to Hafez al-Assad after the former President married Makhlouf's sister. The family headed by Mohammad Makhlouf has established a vast financial empire in the telecommunication, retail, banking, power generation, and oil and gas sectors. The net worth of the family was estimated in 2010 to be at least five billion dollars.

Mohammed Makhlouf (1932–2020), made a fortune, both through management of state companies and in the private sector.
Rami Makhlouf (born 1969), is a wealthy businessman and the main owner of SyriaTel. According to the Financial Times he is thought to control as much as 60% of the economy through his web of business interests that include telecommunications, oil and gas, construction, banking, airlines and retail, and he is widely seen as the business arm of the Assad government. American government sources report that Rami Makhlouf has used the Syrian security services and his personal relationship to President Assad to intimidate and steal promising business ventures from other businessmen. He is regarded as Syria's wealthiest man – worth approximately 5 billion dollars. In 2020, intense dispute arose between Makhlouf and Bashar al-Assad over the issue of backtaxes; which severely damaged Assad's reputation amongst Alawite loyalists.
Col. Hafez Makhlouf (1971), was the deputy director of the General Security Directorate and intelligence chief of the Damascus branch.
Iyad Makhlouf (born 1973), twin of Ihab Makhlouf, is a General Security Directorate officer. The EU, US, and UK sanctioned him for being involved in violence against the civilian population during the Syrian Civil War.
Ihab Makhlouf (born 1973), twin of Iyad Makhlouf, is former Vice-Chairman of SyriaTel and caretaker for Rami Makhlouf's US company. The EU sanctioned him for providing funding to the Assad government and allowing violence against demonstrators in the Syrian Civil War. He is believed to be in charge of the sniper units that are being used to shoot at protestors in the uprising.
Fatma Makhlouf, sister of Anisa Makhlouf.
Atef Najib, is the former head of Political Security Directorate in Deraa. The EU sanctioned him for being involved in violence against demonstrators in the Syrian civil war.
 General Adnan Makhlouf, first cousin of Anisa, former commander of the Republican Guard.

Hafez's cousins
Namir al-Assad, reportedly established the Shabiha with Rifaat al-Assad in the 1980s and controlled the organized smuggling networks, anchored in Latakia's port.
Adnan al-Assad, leader of "Struggle Companies" militia in Damascus.
Gen. Shafiq Fayadh, cousin of Hafez from his aunt in the village of Ayn al-Arus in Jableh. Commander of the 7th Mechanized Infantry Division 1973–78. Commander of the 3rd Armored Division since 1978. Reportedly incapacitated in 1991/92 due to a heart attack. Batatu describes him as an army corps general.

Other relatives
 Numeir al-Assad, second degree cousin of Hafez's children, led the Shabiha in Latakia.
 Nizar al-Assad, is a cousin of Bashar Al-Assad. He was the head of the Nizar Oilfield Supplies company. He was sanctioned by the EU for being very close to key government officials and for financing Shabiha in the region of Latakia.
 Fawaz al-Assad, nephew of Hafez, leader of Shabiha
 Mundhir al-Assad, nephew of Hafez, leader of Shabiha
 Samer al-Assad, son of Kamal and grandson of Ismael who was a half-brother of Hafez al-Assad, runs one of several Captagon factories in Al-Bassah.

See also
List of political families

References
Citations

Bibliography

External links

Syria's First Family, Slate Magazine, 10 February 2012
Bashar al-Assad's inner circle, BBC, 10 May 2011
Syria's Leaders, Esther Pan, Council on Foreign Relations, 10 March 2006

 
Syrian families
Political families of Syria
Syrian Alawites